Abani may refer to:

Abani (name)
Abani Bari Achho, Bengali poem